Varash, from 1977 to 2016 Kuznetsovsk, is a city in Rivne Oblast, Ukraine. It hosts the administration of Varash urban hromada, one of the hromadas of Ukraine and Varash Raion, one of the raions of Ukraine. Population: 

The mayor of Varash is Oleksandr Menzul.

History
The first written mention of Varash is dated back to 1577 as   "ZIEMIE RUSKIE. WOLYN i PODOLE". A modern urban-type settlement was started on 1973 as a company town of the Rivne Nuclear Power Plant. The new town was named in honor of the Soviet intelligence agent, partisan Nikolai Kuznetsov. The plan of the city reflects the ideals of late socialist realism. Part of the city occupies the site of the former village of Varash, founded in 1776. Now it is one of the districts in the city.

On 19 May 2016, Verkhovna Rada adopted decision to rename Kuznetsovsk to Varash and conform to the law prohibiting names of Communist origin.

Geography
Varash is located in the Volhynian Polesie in the north of Rivne Oblast. It is located over the Styr River which is a tributary of Pripyat River between Volodymyrets Raion (Rivne Oblast) and Manevychi Raion (Volyn Oblast).

Education
There are 12 kindergartens, 6 secondary schools, a high school, a music school, college, and a branch of the Kyiv Institute of Management in the city.

Press
Three newspapers are published in Varash. In addition, a television station and a radio company are operated here.

Architecture
As Varash is a relatively young city, it has a typical building style from the Soviet period. Today the city continues to grow and expand.

Religion
There are a few churches and a cathedral.
The architectural symbol of the city is the Svyato-Preobrazhenskiy Cathedral.

Interesting Facts

 The city population grew steadily despite the country reduction tendency.
 Varash is one of the world's cities which coat of arms contains nuclear plant factory.

References

External links
 varash.rv.gov.ua - Varash City Council

Cities in Rivne Oblast
Populated places established in 1973
Populated places established in the Ukrainian Soviet Socialist Republic
Cities of regional significance in Ukraine
Wołyń Voivodeship (1921–1939)
City name changes in Ukraine
Former Soviet toponymy in Ukraine
Company towns in Ukraine
1973 establishments in Ukraine
Socialist planned cities